The barred gecko (Cyrtodactylus martinstolli) is a species of lizard in the family Gekkonidae. The species is endemic to Nepal.

Etymology
The specific name, martinstolli, is in honor of Swiss photographer Martin Stoll (born 1956).

Reproduction
C. martinstolli is oviparous.

References

Further reading
Darevsky, Ilya S.; Helfenberger, Notker; Orlov, Nikolai L.; Shah, Karan (1988). "Two New Species of the Genus Gonydactylus (Sauria: Gekkonidae) from Eastern Nepal". Russian Journal of Herpetology 4 (2): 89-93. (Gonydactylus martinstolli, new species).
Rösler H (2000). "Kommentierte Liste der rezent, subrezent und fossil bekannten Geckotaxa (Reptilia: Gekkonomorpha)". Gekkota 2: 28–153. (Cyrtopodion martinstolli, new combination, p. 74). (in German).

Cyrtodactylus
Reptiles described in 1998
Taxa named by Ilya Darevsky